The Groote dwarf blind snake (Anilios minimus) is a species of snake in the family Typhlopidae. It is endemic to the Northern Territory, Australia.

References

Anilios
Endemic fauna of Australia
Snakes of Australia
Reptiles of the Northern Territory
Taxa named by James Roy Kinghorn
Reptiles described in 1929